Newton Stewart is an unincorporated community in Orange County, in the U.S. state of Indiana.

History
Newton Stewart was platted in 1839 by William and Henry Stewart. According to Ronald L. Baker, the community's name may also allude to Newton Stewart, in Scotland. A post office was established at Newton Stewart in 1850, and remained in operation until it was discontinued in 1973.

Geography

References

Unincorporated communities in Orange County, Indiana
Unincorporated communities in Indiana